Donie O'Sullivan may refer to:
 Donie O'Sullivan (Gaelic footballer), Gaelic footballer from County Kerry, Ireland
 Donie O'Sullivan (journalist), CNN journalist from County Kerry, Ireland